Tourniquet may refer to:

 Tourniquet, a medical device used to control blood flow to an extremity:
 Surgical tourniquet, a specialised surgical tool
 Emergency tourniquet, used to stop blood loss in an emergency
 Hair tourniquet, a condition often requiring medical attention
 Tourniquet test

Music 
 Tourniquet (band), an American Christian metal band
 Tourniquet (album), a 2001 album by Larry Norman
 The Tourniquet, a 2005 album by Magnet
 "Tourniquet" (Breaking Benjamin song), 2017
 "Tourniquet" (Marilyn Manson song), 1997
 "Tourniquet", a song by Evanescence from Fallen, 2003
 "Tourniquet", a song by Headswim from Despite Yourself, 1997
 "Tourniquet", a song by Jeremy Messersmith, 2013
 "Tourniquet", a song by Knife Party from 100% No Modern Talking, 2011
 "Tourniquet", a song by Tesseract from Polaris, 2015